Marianne Macdonald (born July 9, 1934 in Kenora, Ontario) is a Canadian children's books author and novelist best known for her mystery series featuring London antiques bookstore owner and amateur investigator Dido Hoare.

Main themes of the Dido Hoare novels are responsibility and trust,  the struggles of a single working mother and a complex and troubled father-daughter relationship.

Work 
Dido Hoare Series
 Death's Autograph (1996)
 Ghost Walk (1997)
 Smoke Screen (1999)
 Road Kill (2000)
 Blood Lies (2001)
 Die Once (2002)
 Three Monkeys (2005)
 Faking It (2006)

Children's Books
 Black Bass Rock (1952)
 Smuggler's Cove (1955)
 The Treasure of Ur (1958)
 The Pirate Queen (1991)
 The Eighty-Nine Pennies of Emma Jones (1992)
 The Witch Repair (1995)
 Dragon for Sale (1998)

Literary Criticism
 The State of Literary Theory Today (ed.) (1982)
 Ezra Pound: Purpose/Form/Meaning (1983)
 Ezra Pound and History (ed.) (1985)

External links 

 Dido Hoare Series
 Fine Books & Collections: Bibliomysteries: Marianne MacDonald

1934 births
Living people
People from Kenora
Canadian women novelists
20th-century Canadian novelists
21st-century Canadian novelists
20th-century Canadian women writers
21st-century Canadian women writers
Canadian children's writers
Canadian women children's writers
Canadian mystery writers
Women mystery writers